In Colorado, State Highway 385 may refer to:
U.S. Route 385 in Colorado, the only Colorado highway numbered 385 since 1968
Colorado State Highway 385 (pre-1953) north of Grand Junction